Harold Booton (2 March 1906 – 22 October 1976) was an English professional footballer who made 156 appearances as a right back in the Football League.

Booton was born in Annesley, Nottinghamshire. He began his football career with Annesley Colliery and Shirebrook, and joined Birmingham in 1929. He became a first-team regular for Birmingham after George Liddell retired, and made 162 appearances in all competitions, including 149 in the First Division. He was a solid tackler and kicked powerfully, but his distribution of the ball was wayward. He later played 7 league games for Luton Town, and then moved into non-league football with Atherstone Town. He died in Denham, Buckinghamshire, in 1976 at the age of 70.

References

1906 births
1976 deaths
Footballers from Nottinghamshire
English footballers
Association football fullbacks
Shirebrook Miners Welfare F.C. players
Birmingham City F.C. players
Luton Town F.C. players
Atherstone Town F.C. players
English Football League players
People from Annesley